Styxon is a genus of moths of the family Crambidae. It contains only one species, Styxon ciniferalis, which is found in China (Guangdong).

References

Natural History Museum Lepidoptera genus database

Crambinae
Crambidae genera
Monotypic moth genera
Taxa named by Stanisław Błeszyński